The Last Vacation (French: Les dernières vacances) is a 1948 French drama film directed by Roger Leenhardt and starring Odile Versois, Michel François, and Jean Lara.

The film's art direction was by Léon Barsacq.

Cast

References

Bibliography 
 Michel Marie. The French New Wave: An Artistic School. John Wiley & Sons, 2008.

External links 
 

1948 films
1948 drama films
French drama films
1940s French-language films
Films directed by Roger Leenhardt
French black-and-white films
1940s French films